Gövdərə (also, Gevdara and Gevdere) is a village in the Lerik Rayon of Azerbaijan.  The village forms part of the municipality of Kələxan.

References 

Populated places in Lerik District